OPON can refer to:
The old name of Lapu-Lapu City, Philippines
Special Purpose Police Unit (Azerbaijan) (OPON), special forces detachment in Azerbaijan

See also
OMON